The Society for Court Studies is a learned society that aims to stimulate and co-ordinate the study of royal, princely, and noble courts throughout history. The principal object of the Society is to examine courts from a multi-disciplinary perspective by focusing on a variety of areas such as architectural history, political history, military history, art history, cultural patronage, and the role of women in courts. The Society for Court Studies publishes its own scholarly and peer-reviewed journal, The Court Historian, which appears twice a year. It is a registered charity (no. 1115906).

History 
Interest in courts as political and cultural centres grew in the last decades of the twentieth century. Influential scholars such as Norbert Elias and Geoffrey Elton pointed at princely courts as promising areas of research, a call which began to be heeded in the 1970s and 1980s. The growing interest in court studies and the increasing number of scholars made it possible to create a forum dedicated to court studies. Thus, the Society for Court Studies was founded in London in September 1995 by David Starkey, Robert Oresko, Simon Thurley, and Philip Mansel. The launch was held at Banqueting House and attended by a wide range of scholars from different subjects, different stages in their careers, and different countries, emphasizing the multidisciplinary and international approach of court history. The committee of the society is also composed of scholars from a number of countries. A separate branch was established in North America in 1998. Membership is open to interested people from any country and to any discipline.

The current President and Chairman of the Society since 2017 is Helen Watanabe-O'Kelly, who is a Fellow of Exeter College and Professor of German Literature at Oxford University. She is a distinguished scholar with numerous publications and projects aimed at German courts, festival court culture, and queenship. Other officers of the committee (2019) include David Gelber (Treasurer), Janet Dickinson (Conference Secretary), Jo Tinworth (Seminar Secretary), Charles Farris (Seminar Secretary), Fabian Persson (Social Media Officer), and Jonathan Spangler (Editor). The Chairman of the North American branch of the Society is R. Malcolm Smuts of the University of Massachusetts Boston.

The Society for Court Studies is linked since 2007 with the Centro Studi Europa delle Corti (Ferrara), 'the Centre de Recherche du Château de Versailles', La Corte en Europa Institute of the Independent University of Madrid and the Centro Studi delle Residenze Reali Sabaude (Reggia di Venaria Reale, Turin),  in the Court Studies Forum.

Presidents of the Society 

Helen Watanabe-O'Kelly 2017-

Clarissa Campbell Orr 2012-2017

Simon Thurley 2005-2012

David Starkey 1996-2005

Activities 
The Society for Court Studies organises conferences and a series of research seminars on aspects of court history, which are held three times a term in London (UK).

The Society has organized and co-organized a number of conferences over the years such as "Princes Consort in History", "The Key to Power? The Culture of Access in Early Modern Courts, 1400-1700", "Gifts and Perquisities", "Heirs and Spares", "Monarchy and Exile", and "Animals at Court".

In 2019  conferences and study days included "Performance, Royalty and the Court, 1500-1800" at the Paul Mellon Centre with the support of the Paul Mellon Centre and Birkbeck College.

The journal The Court Historian is peer-reviewed, ranked as yielding a 1 in the Norwegian register of scientific journals, and published by Taylor & Francis.

References 

3- Mansel, Philip - "Power of the Court" , History Today vol. 64 Issue: 9 (2014) http://www.historytoday.com/philip-mansel/power-court

External links 
 
  Twitter: https://twitter.com/courtstudies
  Facebook: https://www.facebook.com/TheSocietyForCourtStudies/

History organisations based in the United Kingdom
Royal and noble courts
Learned societies of the United Kingdom